Claude Michel (20 December 1738 – 29 March 1814), known as Clodion, was a French sculptor in the Rococo style, especially noted for his works in marble, bronze, & terracotta.

Life
He was born in Nancy to Anne Adam and Thomas Michel, an undistinguished sculptor. Anne was the sister of sculptors Lambert-Sigisbert Adam and Francois Gaspard Adam. In Nancy and probably in Lille he spent the earlier years of his life.  In 1755 he came to Paris and entered the workshop of his maternal uncle Lambert-Sigisbert Adam, an established sculptor. He remained four years in this workshop, and on his death became a pupil of Jean-Baptiste Pigalle. In 1759 he won the grand prize for sculpture at the Académie Royale. In 1761 he earned the first silver medal for studies from models. In 1762 he went to Rome, where his activity was considerable between 1767 and 1771.

Catherine II of Russia was eager to secure his presence in St Petersburg, but he returned to Paris. Among his patrons, which were very numerous, were the chapter of Rouen, the states of Languedoc, and the director generale. His works were frequently exhibited at the Salon. In 1782 he married Catherine Flore, a daughter of the sculptor Augustin Pajou, who subsequently obtained a divorce from him. The agitation caused by the French Revolution drove Clodion in 1792 to Nancy, where he remained until 1798, His energies being spent in the decoration of houses.

Among Clodion's works are a statue of Montesquieu, a Dying Cleopatra, and a chimneypiece at present in the Victoria and Albert Museum in London. His 1788 work Dance of Time is in the Frick Collection in New York.  Another known sculpture is called "The Intoxication of Wine". One of his last groups represented Homer as a beggar being driven away by fishermen (1810). Clodion died in Paris, on the eve of the invasion of Paris by the forces of the Sixth Coalition.

Works
Among the public collections holding works by Claude Michel are:
Art Institute of Chicago
Bowes Museum (County Durham,UK)
Carnegie Museum of Art (Pittsburgh, Pennsylvania)
Cleveland Museum of Art
Courtauld Institute of Art (London)
Currier Museum of Art (New Hampshire)
Detroit Institute of Arts
Fine Arts Museums of San Francisco
Getty Museum (Los Angeles)
Honolulu Museum of Art
Kimbell Art Museum (Fort Worth, Texas)

Louvre (Paris)
Metropolitan Museum of Art
Musée Cognacq-Jay (Paris)
Museum of Fine Arts, Boston
Musée des beaux-arts de Bordeaux
Museum Boijmans Van Beuningen (Rotterdam)
National Museum of Art (Cluj-Napoca)
National Gallery of Armenia
National Gallery of Art (Washington D.C.)
Nationalmuseum, Stockholm
Norton Simon Museum (Pasadena,California)
Philadelphia Museum of Art

See also
 Neoclassicism in France

References

Further reading
  (see index, Clodion (Claude Michel): p. 127-128)

External links

 Entry and examples at the Metropolitan Museum of Art in New York City
 Bacchante by Clodion.
 
for examples of a Terracotta relief Satyr and Nymph at the DMK Collection in Germany

1738 births
1814 deaths
18th-century French sculptors
French male sculptors
19th-century French sculptors
19th-century French male artists
18th-century French male artists